Francesco Urso (born 9 June 1994) is an Italian professional footballer who plays as a midfielder for  club Torres.

Career
Born in Fano, Marche region, Urso started his career at Romagna club Cesena. He was a player in the under-17 youth team in 2010–11 season. Urso was promoted to reserve team in 2011–12, which he received first team call-up on 10 March 2012. Urso played a friendly match for the first team on 4 April.; he made his competitive debut in the round 36 (in total 38 rounds) of 2011–12 Serie A, as the half-time substitute of Tommaso Arrigoni. Both players made their unofficial Italy U18 debut on 9 May, against the reserve team of A.S. Livorno Calcio.

On 24 June 2013 Urso was signed by Santarcangelo along with Marco Mariani. Santarcangelo qualified to 2014–15 Serie C as the 5th of Group B of 2013–14 Serie C2.

On 27 June 2014, few days before the closure of 2013–14 financial year, Urso was sold to another third level club Vicenza, with Salvatore Maiorana moved to the Serie A newcomer. Both players were tagged for €2 million transfer fee; Urso signed a 5-year contract. In January 2015 he joined Prato on loan.

On 26 February 2019, he signed with Serie C club Virtus Entella.

On 26 June 2019, Urso signed to Catanzaro until 30 June 2021.

On 1 February 2021 he returned to his hometown club Fano.

On 5 January 2022 he joined Fidelis Andria.

On 30 January 2023, Urso signed with Torres.

Honours
Virtus Entella
 Serie C: 2018–19 (Group A)

References

External links
 AIC profile (data by football.it) 
 

1994 births
Living people
People from Fano
Sportspeople from the Province of Pesaro and Urbino
Footballers from Marche
Italian footballers
Association football midfielders
Serie A players
Serie C players
A.C. Cesena players
Alma Juventus Fano 1906 players
Santarcangelo Calcio players
L.R. Vicenza players
A.C. Prato players
Matera Calcio players
Virtus Entella players
U.S. Catanzaro 1929 players
S.S. Fidelis Andria 1928 players
S.E.F. Torres 1903 players